Arvo Anselm Laine (8 August 1887 – 24 April 1938) was a Finnish athlete. He competed in the men's high jump at the 1912 Summer Olympics.

References

1887 births
1938 deaths
Athletes (track and field) at the 1912 Summer Olympics
Finnish male high jumpers
Olympic athletes of Finland
Sportspeople from Tampere